Rana Hamir Singh is the 26th Rana of Amarkot and a Pakistani politician who has been a member of Provincial Assembly of Sindh since August 2018. He is the one of the 5 children of Rana Chandra Singh. He is the current crown Rajput Ruler of Umerkot and is also titled as 'Rana Saheb'.

Family
His grandfather Rana Arjun Singh contested election in 1946 from All-India Muslim League platform. His father Rana Chandra Singh was initially associated with Pakistan Peoples Party but left it to form Pakistan Hindu Party in 1990. He has one son, Kanwar Karni Singh, who was married into Kanota Rathore royal family of Jaipur in 2015. His family are the Hindu Rajput Rulers of the Sindh Province of Pakistan. He was diagnosed with Covid-19 on 30 April 2020 and now has healed from the virus.

Political career
Singh has been member of Sindh Assembly three times. In 1990, he was elected from the platform of Pakistan Hindu Party on separate electorate for minorities. In 1993, he was a minister for science and technology and research in irrigation. He has been Naib Nazim of Umerkot and vice chairman of Sindh Arid Zone Development Authority.

Further reading

References

External links 

 Rana Hamir Singh. Provincial Assembly of Sindh.

Living people
1957 births
Thari people
Pakistan People's Party MPAs (Sindh)
Politicians from Sindh
People from Umerkot
Pakistani Hindus